Ali Holman is an American national TV fitness expert, author, certified trainer, and sports nutritionist. She was born in Minneapolis, Minnesota, she attended University of Arizona, with a degree in Broadcast Journalism. She is certified through IFPA and ACE.

Holman has been a regular on-air fitness and health expert for media outlets such as CBS, FOX, NBC, NBCSports, ABC Daytime, Glamour, Men's Fitness, Shape Magazine, Women's Forum, DaytimeTV, Good Day LA, Robert Irvine, Yahoo!, and MSN.

Holman is the owner of CoreCamper.com, with members worldwide, that offers daily 20-minute online workouts, meal plans, and recipes. CoreCamper.com allows one to work out when and where one wants.

Holman has been voted one of the “Most Influential Person in Minneapolis” by Mpls.St.Paul Magazine. In addition, she was named the Best Fitness Guru on the Internet by Womensforum and was voted Top Fitness & Wellness Expert on LinkedIn. Holman has been featured in Shape Magazine.

Holman is the author of #StrongGirl: 20 Minute Workouts & Quick Meals to keep you Lean, Trim & Powerful.

Media
Holman has been featured on FOX TV, Good Day LA, Veria Living Fitness Expert: Better TV, WFLA "Daytime", KMSP-TV, NBC's Kare11, The Palm Beach Post, Glamour magazine, Minnesota Parent Magazine, MSN

References

External links
CoreCamper.com

Year of birth missing (living people)
Living people
American exercise instructors
American exercise and fitness writers
American women nutritionists
American nutritionists
University of Arizona alumni